Bandial  (village and one of the 51 Union Councils (administrative subdivisions) of Khushab District in the Punjab Province of Pakistan.

Notable people
The inhabitants of this village are mostly feudal lords consisting of the [Bhacher bandial] clan and famous personalities such as:-
 (Late) Raees e Azam of Bandial
 Malik Sher Muhammad Bandial (He received khilat and was made kursi nasheen in 1917 and he inherited agricultural land of 8000 acers in uttra zail)
 Malik Alamsher Khan Bandial (Appointed as Honorary Magistrate in 1935 till Field Marshal Ayub Khans regime)
 Ex MPA (Late) Malik Khaliqdad Khan Bandial
 Ex Chief Secretary Punjab (Late) Malik Fateh Khan Bandial (Father of Malik Umar Ata Bandial)
 Chief Justice of supreme court Malik Umar Ata Bandial
 SP retired (Late) Malik Pervez Iqbal Bandial
 Malik Farooq Bandial
 Ex Naib Tehsil Nazim Malik Khursheed Iqbal Bandial
 Ex MPA and Ex Parliamentary Secretary Malik Karam Ilahi Bandial
 MPA and Parliamentary Secretary Malik Fateh Khaliq Bandial
 Famous international tent pegger and coach of international tent pegging team of Pakistan Malik Haroon Bandial

References

Union councils of Khushab District
Populated places in Khushab District